Jalan Jelapang (Perak state route A1) is a major road in Perak, Malaysia. It is considered known as Ipoh Outer Ring Road.

List of junctions

Jelapang
Ipoh Outer Ring Road